Faulds can refer to:

Andrew Faulds (1923-2000), British actor and politician
Clare Faulds (born c. 1949), Manx lawyer and vicar
Henry Faulds (1843-1930), Scottish scientist who is noted for the development of fingerprinting
Kristopher Faulds (born in 1994), Scottish footballer
Richard Faulds (born in 1977), British sport shooter
William Frederick Faulds (1895-1950), South African recipient of the Victoria Cross
Faulds (plate armour), a form of plate armour protecting the hips